The Hopi Boys are an Afro-Curaçaoan criminal group from the south-east region of Amsterdam. It is one of the most influential gangs in the Dutch capital. They control many criminal activities (racket, drug dealing, prostitution) in the Amsterdam region.

See also 
 Bijlmermeer
 Penose

References

Gangs in the Netherlands
Street gangs